The Kenilworth Plantation House is a historic plantation house located at 2931 Bayou Road in St. Bernard Parish, Louisiana, United States. According to a sign in front of the house, the French Creole style house was built in 1759. Its nomination to the National Register of Historic Places, however, indicates it was built circa 1820. During the early 19th century, the French Creole style was the predominant architectural form of St. Bernard Parish; however, most of the parish's French Creole buildings from the period are no longer standing, and Kenilworth is one of the best-preserved examples of the style.

The two-story house has a raised basement, and the upper story is considered the primary living space. A gallery supported by turned colonnettes surrounds both stories of the house; all entrances from the gallery feature French doors. The house's hipped roof has an intricate truss support system and exposed, shaped rafter tails typical of Creole designs.

In the 1980s, the home was owned by Dr. Acosta, a Chalmette dentist.

The house was added to the National Register of Historic Places on April 24, 2006.

The house was a filming location for the movie Stay Alive.

References

Dr Acosta died in a car accident in the what the locals call the "Tunnel of Trees" which are oak trees in Meraux on St Bernard Highway.

External links
Louisiana National Register of Historic Places Database entry for the Kenilworth Plantation House

Plantation houses in Louisiana
Houses in St. Bernard Parish, Louisiana
Houses on the National Register of Historic Places in Louisiana
Creole architecture in Louisiana
Antebellum architecture
National Register of Historic Places in St. Bernard Parish, Louisiana